Willax Televisión (commonly known as Willax) is a Peruvian television channel. It began as an internet channel in 2010 with a television channel launching later that year.

History 
From the Quechua word Willakuy meaning "news", Willax was founded by journalist Gilberto Hume and his wife Cecilia Valenzuela in 2010. Willax was founded after the relaunch of AgenciaPerú, originally released in 2008.

The channel began broadcasting on the Internet, in early 2010, as a news channel operated out of the former Monitor studios in San Borja. Later it starts as a cable television channel.

In 2014, Willax is transferred to channel 18 in Movistar TV's analog cable service.

In November 2015, the channel was purchased by Erasmo Wong Lu, former owner of the Wong supermarket chain, via its company Corporación EW. After the acquisition, Wong Lu transitioned Willax into a free-to-air television station on Lima's digital terrestrial television and changes the focus of the channel; its programming changes from being a news channel to a general channel, although it maintains its news and current affairs programming. It also changed its operations headquarters in the Plaza Norte shopping center in Independencia District. Later, Willax would acquire the Monitor studios, and return to the studios where Willax still record some programs.

Since 2015, Willax has changed its programming and began broadcasting shows made up of entertainment programs, news and political spaces.

In 2017, the Korean doramas are incorporated into the channel's programming, after having bought the rights to Panamericana Televisión.

In 2018, Willax starts airing animes, which would continue transmitting until before the COVID-19 pandemic.

In 2020, Willax increased the number of original productions on the channel, especially political opinion programs (Beto a Saber, La Hora Caviar, Rey con Barba, ComButters) with prime hours from 8:00 p.m. to midnight. In April, due to the closure of schools for to the COVID-19 pandemic, the channel began broadcasting to TV Peru with the program Aprendo en casa in the mornings.

For 2022, the channel continues with generalist programming; focused on news, entertainment, social support, sports, showbiz; In addition, in its programming at night there are programs of political opinion and at dawn, promotion of natural products.

Political alignment 
The channel has been described as conservative and right-wing by international media outlets. Willax supported Keiko Fujimori and her Fujimorism movement according to Peruvian journalist Augusto Álvarez Rodrich. The owner of Willax, Wong Lu, signed the Madrid Charter, a document opposing the presence of left-wing governments in Ibero-America.

Controversy

2021 Peruvian general election 
According to Spanish newspaper El País, Willax is "a channel known for ... broadcasting of false news". During the 2021 Peruvian general election which saw right-wing Keiko Fujimori and leftist Pedro Castillo compete for the presidency, Peruvian psychologist Henry Guillén stated that "fake news has gone viral regarding Castillo and his links with the Shining Path, media like Willax have defamed several leftist leaders who accompany him". Willax journalists Milagros Leiva and Beto Ortiz called for the National Jury of Elections to dissolve its fact checking system to combat fake news. Leiva also accused the National Office of Electoral Processes of supporting electoral fraud stating that her deceased father-in-law was still registered to vote, though the office replied saying that the registry was locked in place since his death, telling Leiva "Please don't spread fake news".

On 18 July 2021, the Public Ministry of Peru opened an investigation into Willax journalists Philip Butters, Humberto Ortiz and Enrique Luna Victoria, alleging that they were responsible for acts of sedition and inciting civil unrest. Prosecutor Juana Meza wrote that Willax disseminated "news with a conspiratorial connotation, inciting the electoral results to be unknown, trying to weaken the electoral institutions and even calling for a coup d'état" and was used as a platform "to send messages of hatred and incitement to kill". Presidential candidate Rafael López Aliaga was also named in the investigation. López Aliaga reportedly called for death in two separate incidents; in May 2021 he chanted "Death to communism! Death to Cerrón! Death to Castillo!" to supporters and at the Respect My Vote rally that was organized by Willax TV owner Erasmo Wong Lu on 26 June 2021, where the politician stated "Death to communism, get out of here, filthy communists, you have awakened the lion, to the streets!"

Other incidents 
In July 2017, Phillip Butters of Willax's ComButters program made controversial comments about Afro-Ecuadorians on Ecuador's football team, stating "The Ecuadorians aren't black, they're mountain crocodiles" and that Felipe Caicedo "isn't human, he's a monkey. A gorilla." Willax suspended the program until Butters made an apology.

During the 2020 Peruvian protests, the Willax channel's Rey con Barba program broadcast images of homemade weapons purporting they were used in Peru when they were actually seized from Chilean protests; an attempt to discredit protests according to Perú.21.

References

External links 
  

Television stations in Peru
Television channels and stations established in 2010
Spanish-language television stations
Television networks in Peru
2010 establishments in Peru